Maheriv is an urban-type settlement in Lviv Raion of Lviv Oblast in Ukraine. Maheriv hosts the administration of Dobrosyn-Maheriv settlement hromada, one of the hromadas of Ukraine. Population: 

Until 18 July 2020, Maheriv belonged to Zhovkva Raion. The raion was abolished in July 2020 as part of the administrative reform of Ukraine, which reduced the number of raions of Lviv Oblast to seven. The area of Zhovkva Raion was merged into Lviv Raion.

Economy

Transportation
It is on the railway connecting Lviv via Zhovkva with Rava-Ruska. There is infrequent passenger traffic.

The settlement has access to Highway M09 which connects Lviv with Rava-Ruska, crosses into Poland and continues to Zamość.

References

Urban-type settlements in Lviv Raion